The Capital Governorate is one of the four governorates of Bahrain. The governorate includes Manama, the capital of Bahrain. It is the most populous administrative region in the country, with a population of over half million people in 2020.

Formation
The Capital Governorate was formed by royal decree on 3 July 2002. The present governorate incorporates the municipalities of Al Manamah, Jid Ali, Ras Rumman and parts of Jidd Haffs.

Demographics
According to a census conducted in 2010, there are 329,510 people living in the Capital Governorate, which is the highest of the four governorates; 261,921 non-Bahraini citizens and 67,589 Bahraini nationals.  The vast majority of housing in the Capital Governorate are flats, with around 34,000 flats. Private villas were the second most-common form of housing, accounting for 7,284 of housing in the governorate. 

As of 2020, the governorate's total population stands at 534,939 people in a land area of 90 km2, with a population density of 5927.

References

Governorates of Bahrain